(September 20, 1923, Tokyo, Japan - October 24, 2005, Shinjuku, Tokyo) was a Japanese actor, and the grandson of Rudolf Dittrich, an Austrian musician. 

He appeared in 128 films.

Filmography

Film

 Pen itsuwarazu, bôryoku no machi (1950)
 Shojoho (1950)
 Kumo no machi (1950)
 Mesu inu (1951) - Keiichi Shirakawa
 Honoo no hada (1951)
 Asakusa kurenaidan (1952) - Shimakichi
 Nagasaki No Uta Wa Wasureji (1952) - Nogami, Hiroyuki
 Shino machi o nogarete (1952) - Shiro Nomura
 Mōjū tsukai no shōjo (1952)
 Lightning (1952) - Shuzo
 Zoku Jûdai no seiten (1953) - Masato Miki
 Zoku zoku Jûdai no seiten (1953) - Shingo Arai
 Jūdai no yūwaku (1953)
 Konjiki yasha (1954) - Kan-ichi
 Asakusa no yoru (1954) - Tozuki
 Midori no nakama (1954) - Ippei Takazu
 Tsuki yori no shisha (1954)
 Kawa no aru shitamachi no hanashi (1955) - Gizô Kurita
 Hotaru no hikari (1955)
 Nanatsu no kao no ginji (1955)
 A Girl Isn't Allowed to Love (1955) - Shin'ichirō Matsushima
 Asakusa no oni (1955)
 Shichinin no ani imôto (1955) - Natsu / Keiichi
 Hanayome no tameiki (1956) - Keita Funayama
 Asakusa no hi (1956)
 Ninjô baka (1956)
 Gogo 8 ji 13 pun (1956) - Jôji Harada
 Teahouse of the August Moon (1956) - Mr. Seiko
 Tsuki no kôdôkan (1956)
 Hibana (1956)
 Wasureji no gogo 8 ji 13 pun (1957) - Jôji Harada
 Danryu (1957) - Yuzo Hiashi
 Daitokai no gozen 3-ji (1958)
 The Loyal 47 Ronin (1958) - Sagaminokami Tsuchiya
 Tabi wa Kimagure Kaze Makase (1958)
 Haha (1958) - Ryôtarô Yuasa
 Akasen no hi wa kiezu (1958) - Inutaro
 Yoru no sugao (1958) - Wakabayashi
 Kyohansha (1958)
 Sasameyuki (1959) - Itakura
 Haha no omokage (1959) - Sadao Sagawa
 Yamada Nagamasa - Oja no ken (1959) - Gorobei Onishi
 Jirôchô Fuji (1959)
 Jan Arima no shûgeki (1959)
 Kaigunheigakkô monogatari: Aa! Etajima (1959)
 Machibugyô nikki: Tekka botan (1959) - Gônosuke Hori
 A Woman's Testament (1960) - Kanemitsu
 The Demon of Mount Oe (1960)
 Kenju no okite (1960)
 Afraid to Die (1960) - Yusaku Sagara
 Satan's Sword (1960) - Serizawa
 Zoku Jirocho Fuji (1960)
 Kizû tsu ita yajû (1960)
 Furaî monogatari-âbara hishâ (1960)
 Harekosode (1961)
 Tôshi reijô (1961) - Professor
 Ginza no bonbon (1961) - Ozaki
 A Wife Confesses (1961) - Lawyer Sugiyama
 Buda (1961) - Mahakashyapa
 Katei no jijô (1962) - Ochiai
 Yûkai (1962) - Takaoka
 Nessa no tsuki (1962)
 Yatchaba no Onna (1962)
 Makkanâ koi no monogatari (1963)
 Hanzaî sakusen nanbâ wan (1963)
 Odoritai yoru (1963) - Takashi Dan
 Kyojin Ôkuma Shigenobu (1963) - Hiroshi Nakai
 Kuro no kyôki (1964)
 Mushuku mono jingi (1965)
 A, zerosen (1965) - Takada
 The Guardman: Tokyo yôjimbô (1965) - Ôishi
 Rokyoku komori-uta (1965)
 Ninkyo otoko ippiki (1965)
 The Dragon's Fangs (1966)
 Satogashi ga kowareru toki (1967) - Azuma
 Mesu ga osu o kuikorosu: Sanbiki no kamakiri (1967) - Shiro Oba
 Rikugun chôhô 33 (1968) - Minoru Sasaki
 Onna no iji (1971)
 Ai to makoto: Kanketsu-hen (1976)
 Hadaka no taisho horo-ki: Yamashita Kiyoshi monogatari (1981)
 Yojôhan iro no nureginu (1983)
 Irodori-gawa (1984) - Soichiro Saso
 Mishima: A Life in Four Chapters (1985) - Kurahara (segment "Runaway Horses")
 Shaso (1989) - Tadayuki Matsuzaki

Television
 Shiroi Kyotō (1967) - Shuji Satomi
 Ten to Chi to (1969) - Imagawa Yoshimoto
 The Return of Ultraman (1971-1972) - Captain Ibuki
 Hachidai Shōgun Yoshimune (1995) - Tokugawa Mitsutomo

References

External links

1923 births
2005 deaths
Japanese male film actors
Japanese people of Austrian descent